Crestone is an album by Paul Winter Consort, released in 2007 through the record label Living Music. The album is named after the community of Crestone, Colorado. The album was recorded in the Sangre de Cristo Mountains, the Great Sand Dunes, and the San Luis Valley of southern Colorado, all of which are located near Crestone. In 2008, the album earned the group a Grammy Award for Best New Age Album.

Track listing
 "Songs to the Mountains"  	  	
 "Koji Island" 		
 "Blue Horse Special" 		
 "Calling the Buffalo" 		
 "Zen Morning" 		
 "Witchi Tai To (Invocation)" 		
 "Whooper Dance" 		
 "Intertribal Pow-Wow Song" 		
 "Mountain Treefrogs" 		
 "Cloud" 		
 "The Smell of the Rain" 		
 "Meadowlark" 		
 "Sunset on the Great Sand Dunes" 		
 "Nightfall in the Wetlands" 		
 "Moonrise Over the Sangres"		
 "All My Relations" 		
 "Bumblebee Honor Song" 		
 "Home on the Range" 		
 "Witchi Tai to"		
 "Goodnight to the Mountains"

Personnel
 Paul Winter – soprano saxophone
 Paul McCandless – oboe, bass clarinet
 Don Grusin – keyboard
 Eugene Friesen – cello
 Glen Velez – percussion
 John-Carlos Perea – voice, drum, cedar flute
 Koji Nakamura – taiko drum
 Peter May – conch shells
 Richard Cooke – voice

References

2007 albums
Grammy Award for Best New Age Album
Living Music albums
Paul Winter Consort albums